Lepadella is a genus of rotifers belonging to the family Lepadellidae. The genus has a cosmopolitan distribution

Species
The following species are recognised in the genus Lepadella:
 
Lepadella abbei 
Lepadella acuminata 
Lepadella adjuncta 
Lepadella akrobeles 
Lepadella amazonica 
Lepadella amphitropis 
Lepadella angusta 
Lepadella apsicora 
Lepadella apsida 
Lepadella astacicola 
Lepadella benjamini 
Lepadella berzinsi 
Lepadella beyensi 
Lepadella bicornis 
Lepadella bidentata 
Lepadella biloba 
Lepadella borealis 
Lepadella branchicola 
Lepadella canadaensis 
Lepadella chengalathi 
Lepadella cornuta 
Lepadella costata 
Lepadella costatoides 
Lepadella cristata 
Lepadella cryphaea 
Lepadella crytopus 
Lepadella curvicaudata 
Lepadella cyrtopus 
Lepadella dactyliseta 
Lepadella decora 
Lepadella degreefi 
Lepadella deridderae 
Lepadella desmeti 
Lepadella discoidea 
Lepadella donneri 
Lepadella dorsalis 
Lepadella duvigneaudi 
Lepadella ehrenbergii 
Lepadella elliptica 
Lepadella elongata 
Lepadella eurysterna 
Lepadella evaginata 
Lepadella favorita 
Lepadella gelida 
Lepadella glossa 
Lepadella hanneloreae 
Lepadella haueri 
Lepadella heterodactyla 
Lepadella heterostyla 
Lepadella hyalina 
Lepadella imbricata 
Lepadella intermedia 
Lepadella jingruae 
Lepadella koniari 
Lepadella kostei 
Lepadella lata 
Lepadella latusimus 
Lepadella latusinus 
Lepadella lindaui 
Lepadella longiseta 
Lepadella margalefi 
Lepadella mascarensis 
Lepadella mataca 
Lepadella mica 
Lepadella minorui 
Lepadella minoruoides 
Lepadella minuscula 
Lepadella minuta 
Lepadella monodactyla 
Lepadella monodi 
Lepadella myersi 
Lepadella nartiangensis 
Lepadella neboissi 
Lepadella neglecta 
Lepadella nympha 
Lepadella obtusa 
Lepadella ovalis 
Lepadella paparoa 
Lepadella parasitica 
Lepadella parvula 
Lepadella patella 
Lepadella pejleri 
Lepadella persimilis
Lepadella pontica 
Lepadella princisi 
Lepadella psammophila 
Lepadella pseudoacuminata 
Lepadella pseudosimilis 
Lepadella pterygoida 
Lepadella pterygoides 
Lepadella ptilota 
Lepadella pumilo 
Lepadella punctata 
Lepadella pyriformis 
Lepadella quadricarinata 
Lepadella quadricurvata 
Lepadella quinquecostata 
Lepadella rhodesiana 
Lepadella rhomboides 
Lepadella rhomboidula 
Lepadella riedeli 
Lepadella rottenburgi 
Lepadella sali 
Lepadella salisburii 
Lepadella serrata 
Lepadella strepta 
Lepadella tana 
Lepadella tenella 
Lepadella triba 
Lepadella tricostata 
Lepadella triprojectus 
Lepadella triptera 
Lepadella tyleri 
Lepadella vandenbrandei 
Lepadella vanoyei 
Lepadella venefica 
Lepadella visenda 
Lepadella vitrea 
Lepadella weijiai 
Lepadella whitfordi 
Lepadella wilungulai 
Lepadella wrighti 
Lepadella xenica 
Lepadella yangambi 
Lepadella zigzag 
 BOLD:AAL6505 (Lepadella sp.)
 BOLD:AAZ9992 (Lepadella sp.)

References

Rotifer genera
Ploima